Peter Sandys-Clarke (born 1981, in Darlington, County Durham) is an English stage and television actor.  He plays Edward Burne-Jones in the 2009 BBC2 series Desperate Romantics.

He has also appeared in Foyle's War (as Mark Wilcox), The Play's the Thing, Frankie Howard: Rather You Than Me, Torchwood, and Bonekickers.

In theatre he has appeared in productions including The Letter,  Jingo, and Journey's End (Duke of York's Theatre, as 2Lt Raleigh), in which one reviewer called his performance "faultless". He has also appeared as Freddy in Pygmalion and in When We Are Married by J.B. Priestley. In 2020, he portrayed Lieutenant William Havers in the BBC sitcom Ghosts.
His grandfather was Willward Alexander Sandys-Clarke VC.

References

External links
Sandys-Clarke profile at Foyle's War fan site

1981 births
Living people
English male television actors
English male stage actors
People from Darlington
Actors from County Durham